The Lippert House is a historic building located in Mason City, Iowa, United States.  Built in 1923, this two-story duplex is significant for its C-shaped plan and strong Prairie School influences.  It features brick on the first floor, stucco on the second, wide eaves, broad hip roof, and  a common utility wall.   The house was listed on the National Register of Historic Places in 1980.

References

Houses completed in 1923
Prairie School architecture in Iowa
Houses in Mason City, Iowa
National Register of Historic Places in Mason City, Iowa
Houses on the National Register of Historic Places in Iowa